The Cork–Galway rivalry is a hurling rivalry between Cork and Galway. The fixture is an irregular one due to both teams playing in separate provinces.

Roots

Statistics

Notable moments

 Galway 4-15 : 2-19 Cork (17 August 1975 at Croke Park) -  The 1975 All Ireland semi-final took place on one of the hottest days of one of the hottest summers of the century. Cork may have been "a bit rusty" after winning Munster and over-confidence may have been a factor. In any event, Galway hit them hard and hit them fast. They scored a couple of goals early on, they continued to get scores at opportune times and come the end, they had two points in hand, 4-15 to 2-19.
 Galway 2-14 : 1-13 Cork (5 August 1979 at Croke Park) - Cork were aiming for an historic four-in-a-row and hence were the defending All-Ireland champions. After a record equalling fifth consecutive Munster title on the back of a final win over Limerick, Cork were expected to see off the Galway challenge comfortably. Galway, on the other hand, were coming with a team of their own backboned by the likes of the Connolly brothers and Noel Lane. In front of a paltry attendance of 12,315, Galway shocked the hurling world by dumping the holders out and progressed to the 1979 decider.
 Cork 5-15 : 2-21 Galway (2 September 1990 at Croke Park) - Having recovered from a poor start Galway looked likely winners when holding a seven-points lead early in the second half, but they ceded control at a critical stage. Kevin Hennessy gave Cork a dream start goaling inside the first minute and the last of their five goals, from John Fitzgibbon in the 63rd minute ensured a 27th title.

All-time results

Legend

Senior

Intermediate

Junior

Minor

References

External links
 Cork V Galway all-time statistics

Galway
Galway county hurling team rivalries